Vladimir Igorevich Gurevich (Russian: Владимир Игоревич Гуревич) is a prominent scientist, inventor and author in the field of electrical engineering with 15 books, more than 200 journal papers and over 100 patents on the topic of relays.

V. I. Gurevich was born in Kharkiv, Ukraine, in 1956. He received an M.S.E.E. degree (1978) at the Kharkiv Petro Vasylenko National Technical University of Agriculture, and a Candidate of Sciences (Ph.D.) degree, 1986, at the National Technical University Kharkiv Polytechnic Institute. His academic and professional career includes: assistant, associate, and full (honorary) professor at the Petro Vasylenko University, as well as the chief engineer and the director of Inventor, Ltd. He is currently employed as a Senior Electrical Engineering Expert by the Israel Electric Corporation.

V. I. Gurevich is the founder of a new kind of electrical relays called gerkotrones, also known as high voltage interface relays, which are used in control and protection circuits of high voltage (10-100 kV) high power equipment. He personally developed and supervised R&D of electrical and electronic devices for many military applications and also developed and organized production of many kinds of automatic devices and systems for industrial and power applications.

A significant part of Dr. Gurevich's work is also devoted to the problem of reliability of digital protective relays. In recent years, he has published dozens of papers and two books, wherein he discusses protection means of the electronic equipment of power plants and substations against intended destructive electromagnetic impacts (including electromagnetic pulse).

Dr. V. Gurevich is Expert of Technical Committee SC77C (High Power Transient Phenomena) with International Electrotechnical Commission - IEC  (Standardization for protection civilian equipment, systems and installations from High Altitude Electromagnetic Pulse - HEMP at nuclear detonations and from sources of Intentional Electromagnetic Interference - IEMI), Full Member of CIGRE WG C4.54 (Protection of high voltage power network control electronics from the High-altitude Electromagnetic Pulse - HEMP)

Dr. V. Gurevich is International Editorial Board member of scientific and technical journals:
 
Elektrotehnìka ì Elektromehanìka

International Journal of Research Studies in Electrical and Electronics Engineers

Journal of  Electrical and  Electronic  Engineering

Power Engineering and Computer Integrated Technologies in AIC

Selected books
 Protection Devices and Systems for High-Voltage Applications, New York: Marcel Dekker, 2003, 292 p.
 Electric Relays: Principles and Applications, New York – London – Boca Raton: CRC Press (Taylor & Francis Group), 2005, 704 p.
 Electronic Devices on Discrete Components for Industrial and Power Engineering, New York – London – Boca Raton: CRC Press (Taylor & Francis Group), 2008, 420 p.
 Digital Protective Relays: Problems and Solutions, New York – London – Boca Raton: CRC Press (Taylor & Francis Group), 2010, 404 p.
 Power Supply Devices and Systems of Relay Protection, New York – London – Boca Raton: CRC Press (Taylor & Francis Group), 2013, 264 p.
 Cyber and Electromagnetic Threats in Modern Relay Protection,  New York – London – Boca Raton: CRC Press (Taylor & Francis Group), 2014,  222 p.
 Protection of Substation Critical Equipment Against Intentional Electromagnetic Threats - London: Wiley, 2016, 300 p.
 Protecting Electrical Equipment: Good Practices for Preventing High Altitude Electromagnetic Pulse Impacts - De Gruyter, Berlin, 2019, 400 p
Protecting Electrical Equipment: New Practices for Preventing High Altitude Electromagnetic Pulse Impacts - De Gruyter, Berlin, 2021, 204 p
Nuclear Electromagnetic Pulse: Practical Guide for Protection Critical Infrastructure - Lambert Academic Publishing, 2023, 460 p.

References

External links
Official website

Living people
Ukrainian electrical engineers
1956 births
Engineers from Kharkiv
Kharkiv Petro Vasylenko National Technical University of Agriculture alumni
Academic staff of the Kharkiv Petro Vasylenko National Technical University of Agriculture